This is a list of hillside letters (also known as mountain monograms) in the U.S. state of Oregon. There are at least 39 hillside letters, acronyms, and messages in the state, possibly more; primarily in small towns in the arid eastern half of the state.

Sources

Oregon
Oregon culture
Lists of public art in Oregon